Suphakphaa was the king of Ahom kingdom from 1422 CE to 1439 CE. He was the son of the king Sujangphaa. Suphakphaa succeeded his father in 1422 CE and reigned for seventeen years. Nothing of any importance was recorded by Ahom chronicles about his reign. He died in 1439 CE and was succeeded by his son, Susenphaa.

See also
 Ahom dynasty
 Ahom kingdom
 Assam
 Charaideo
 Sibsagar district
 Singarigharutha ceremony
 Sukaphaa

Notes

References

 

Ahom kings

Ahom kingdom

15th-century monarchs in Asia

1430s deaths
Year of birth unknown
Year of death uncertain